Succession is the act or process of following in order.

Governance and politics 
Order of succession, in politics, the ascension to power by one ruler, official, or monarch after the death, resignation, or removal from office of another, usually in a clearly defined order
Succession of states, in international relations, is the process of recognition and acceptance of a newly created state by other states, based on a perceived historical relationship the new state has with a prior state
Succession planning, in organizations, identifying and developing individuals to succeed to senior positions in government, business, organizations, etc.
Successor company / Successor corporation / Successor in Business

Inheritance 
Apostolic succession, the doctrine, held by some Christian denominations, that bishops are the successors of the original Twelve Apostles, inheriting their spiritual, ecclesiastical and sacramental authority, power, and responsibility
Succession of property, or inheritance, in law, is the passage of an individual's property to one or more dependents according to a formula set out in law, religion, custom or under the terms of a trust
Forced heirship, a form of succession which passes how an estate is to be disposed

Science and mathematics
Succession (geology), in geology, a group of rocks or strata that succeed one another in chronological order
Ecological succession, the series of changes in an ecological community that occur over time after a disturbance. It can be:
Primary succession, when there is a new substrate with no existing vegetation, as after a volcanic lava flow, or
Secondary succession, when the substrate has sustained vegetation, as after a fire or flood
 Successor function, a primitive recursive function in mathematics used to define addition

Arts, entertainment, and media 
"Succession" (30 Rock), an episode of 30 Rock
Succession (TV series), an HBO TV series
 Simultaneity succession, a particular type of Simultaneity (music)

See also 
 
 
Successor (disambiguation)